Billbergia brasiliensis is a species of flowering plant in the genus Billbergia. This species is native to Bolivia and Brazil.

Cultivars
 Billbergia 'Desert Ripple'
 Billbergia 'Happy Days'
 Billbergia 'Hazy Purple'
 Billbergia 'Silversmith'
 Billbergia 'Silverson'
 Billbergia 'Titan'
 Billbergia 'Venesil'
 × Billmea 'Dolly'

References

BSI Cultivar Registry Retrieved 11 October 2009

brasiliensis
Flora of Bolivia
Flora of Brazil